Adolf Kurz (22 April 1888 – 1959) was a German wrestler. He competed in the middleweight event at the 1912 Summer Olympics.

References

External links
 

1888 births
1959 deaths
Date of death missing
Place of death missing
Olympic wrestlers of Germany
Wrestlers at the 1912 Summer Olympics
German male sport wrestlers
People from Göppingen
Sportspeople from Stuttgart (region)